Jimmy Bermúdez Valencia (born 16 December 1987) is a footballer who plays as a centre back for Ecuadorian Serie A club CD Olmedo.

Born and raised in Colombia, he was a member of the Colombia national under-20 team and, as a naturalized citizen, of the Equatorial Guinea national team.

Club career
Born in Puerto Tejada, Cauca, Bermúdez can play as center back.

He played for LDU Loja in two editions of Copa Sudamericana (2012 and 2013).

International career
Baermúdez was a starter for Colombia in the 2007 South American U-20 Championship.

In May 2013, Bermúdez was purchased by the Equatoguinean football team, which then he began to represent, received Equatoguinean citizenship and getting € 3,000 for each match played.

Controversy about eligibility
Bermúdez recognizes that he is not of Equatorial Guinean descent, but considers he can represent the African country as he has not played for Colombia at senior level. According to FIFA's rules, footballers should be holders of the second nationality at the time of playing youth international matches with the original country. This rule has already been applied in the similar case of Portuguese-based Brazilian footballer Fernando. Additionally, when Bermúdez made his international debut with Equatorial Guinea, on 8 June 2013, he had spent his entire club career in Colombia and Ecuador. This aspect violated, thus, the condition D of the relevant current FIFA statute about the eligibility of a player, Article 17: Acquisition of a new nationality, which says: «He has lived continuously for at least five years after reaching the age of 18 on the territory of the relevant Association». Bermúdez was never punished by any of these two situations.

References

External links

1987 births
Living people
Association football central defenders
Colombian footballers
Sportspeople from Cauca Department
Colombia youth international footballers
Categoría Primera A players
Atlético Bucaramanga footballers
Atlético Nacional footballers
Envigado F.C. players
Atlético Huila footballers
Águilas Doradas Rionegro players
Categoría Primera B players
Atlético F.C. footballers
Ecuadorian Serie A players
L.D.U. Loja footballers
Ascenso MX players
Atlante F.C. footballers
Colombian expatriate footballers
Colombian expatriate sportspeople in Ecuador
Expatriate footballers in Ecuador
Colombian expatriate sportspeople in Mexico
Expatriate footballers in Mexico
Expatriate footballers in Equatorial Guinea
Naturalized citizens of Equatorial Guinea
Equatoguinean footballers
Equatorial Guinea international footballers
Equatoguinean people of Colombian descent
Leones Vegetarianos FC players